Rust Macpherson Deming (born October 11, 1941) is a professor and retired American diplomat. He was the Deputy Chief of Mission of the United States to Japan from 1993 to 1996 and Ambassador of the United States to Tunisia from 2011 to 2013.

Early life
Deming, a great-great-grandson of Nathaniel Hawthorne, was born in 1941 to father Olcott Deming, the first U.S. ambassador to Uganda, and mother Louis Macpherson on October 11, 1941, in Greenwich, Connecticut.

He graduated from Rollins College in 1964, and earned a master's degree in East Asian Studies from Stanford University in 1981. 
He is married to Kristen Deming, and has three daughters and seven grandchildren, with his eldest granddaughter currently attending Princeton University.

Foreign Service career
Deming joined the State Department in 1966 as a political officer in the United States Embassy in Tunis, Tunisia.  He spent much of his career dealing with Japanese affairs, having served in Japan as Chargé d'Affaires, ad interim, from December 1996 to September 1997 and as Deputy Chief of Mission under Ambassador Walter Mondale from October 1993 to December 1996. From September 1991 to August 1993, he was Director of the Office of Japanese Affairs in Washington, DC. He served as Minister Counselor for Political Affairs at the American Embassy in Tokyo from August 1987 to July 1991. From 1985 to 1986, he was detailed to the National War College in Washington, DC.

Later life
Deming is currently an adjunct professor at the Johns Hopkins University School of Advanced International Studies, where he teaches in the Japan Studies department. In 2014, he received the Order of the Rising Sun, Gold Rays and Neck Ribbon from the government of Japan. He is chairman emeritus of the Japan America Society of Washington, DC and a member of the Council on Foreign Relations, the American Foreign Service Association, and the Stanford University Alumni Association.

External links
 Johns Hopkins University biography, accessed November 16, 2015
Embassy of Japan in the United States announcement, November 3, 2013
The Association for Diplomatic Studies and Training interview, December 8, 2004

References 

1941 births
Ambassadors of the United States to Tunisia
Rollins College alumni
People from Greenwich, Connecticut
Living people
20th-century American diplomats
21st-century American diplomats